Maciej Gordon (born January 27, 1973 in Bydgoszcz) is a Polish basketball player, club and national team coach. He mainly played as a shooting guard and a small forward; After the end of his playing career - coach of women's basketball club senior teams (long-time coach AZS UW Warszawa, since 2020 in SKK Polonia Warszawa) and youth national teams (currently the Polish U-16 national team). In 2006, at the Academy of Physical Education in Gdańsk, after defending his thesis, he received the first class of coach.

Coaching achievements 

 as a club coach (senior teams):
 twice the title of coach of the year of group A of the I Women's League (2016 i 2021)
 promotion to Energa Basket Liga Kobiet (2021, with SKK Polonia Warszawa)
 three times winning the gold medal of the Polish Academic Championships (2014 i 2017 - as head coach, 2021 - as an assistant; all with AZS UW Warszawa)
 academic vice-championship of Europe (2015)
 as a club coach (youth teams):
 two bronze medals at the Polish junior women's championships (2004 - as a head coach, 2011 - as an assistant)
 Polish female cadet championship (2001, with SKS 12 Warszawa)
 multiple participation in the Polish championships of youth groups
 as a national team coach (youth teams):
 European championship of female cadet of B division and promotion to A division (2016)
 1st place in the FIBA U15 Women's Skills Challenge 2021 group and promotion to the Global Skills Challenge

References 

Living people
1973 births
Sportspeople from Bydgoszcz
Polish basketball players
Polish basketball coaches
Small forwards